Whitewright High School is a public high school located in Whitewright, Texas, United States. It is part of the Whitewright Independent School District located in the southeast corner of Grayson County and classified as a 2A school by the University Interscholastic League (UIL). In 2015, the school was rated "Met Standard" by the Texas Education Agency.

Athletics
The Whitewright Tigers compete in these sports - 

Baseball
Basketball
Cross Country
Football
Golf
Powerlifting
Softball
Tennis
Track and Field
Volleyball
Cheerleading
Marching Band

State Finalists
Boys Basketball - 
1975(1A), 1977(1A)

References

External links
 

Schools in Grayson County, Texas
Public high schools in Texas